Yas is a private superyacht rebuilt by ADMShipyards of Abu Dhabi, launched in 2011 and delivered in 2015. At  in length she is one of the largest motor yachts in the world.

Named Swift141 during development, Yas is based on the hull of a former navy frigate. A second frigate of the same class is undergoing a similar conversion: HNLMS Abraham Crijnssen, renamed Abu Dhabi and Swift135.

References

External links 
 Track Yas in real time

Motor yachts
Ships built in the United Arab Emirates
2011 ships